The men's long jump event at the 1979 Summer Universiade was held at the Estadio Olimpico Universitario in Mexico City on 8 and 9 September 1979.

Medalists

Results

Qualification

Final

References

Athletics at the 1979 Summer Universiade
1979